Ulmus mexicana, the Mexican elm, is a large tree endemic to Mexico and Central America. The tree was first described botanically in 1873.

Description
The tree is also distinguished by its deeply fluted grey trunk, supporting a deep crown, its dense foliage casting a heavy shadow. The leaves vary widely in size from 3–16 cm in length by 2–7 cm breadth, elliptic to obovate, surface glossy, but dull on the underside, with petioles 5–10 mm long. The tree has distinctive racemose inflorescences up to 7 cm in length comprising nine clusters of 40 perfect apetalous wind-pollinated flowers which emerge between December and February. The small samarae, 9.0 × 2.3 mm, are covered with long straight hairs, and are shed in March  . Natural regeneration is poor.

Uses
Although much of its natural range is threatened by deforestation, the tree is singularly unpopular in the timber trade on account of its deeply fluted trunk, and thus not considered endangered. The timber is hard and heavy (Gs 0.55), but difficult to dry, and can warp badly. Moreover, its high silica content (0.35) damages tools. The wood is used for tools, furniture, and floors, whilst the foliage is commonly used as fodder for cattle. The tree is occasionally planted for shade or ornamentation.

Etymology
In Costa Rica the Mexican elm is known as Tirrá; the neighbourhood (district) of Tirrases in Curridabat, San José, takes its name from the tree.

References

External links
https://web.archive.org/web/20060627090133/http://cloudbridge.org/trees/ulmus_mexicana.html The Mexican Elm in Costa Rica

mexicana
Elm species and varieties
Flora of Central America
Flora of Costa Rica
Flora of Guatemala
Flora of Panama
Trees of Central America
Trees of Mexico
Trees of Costa Rica
Trees of Guatemala
Trees of Panama
Trees of San Luis Potosí
Plants described in 1873
Ulmus articles missing images
Cloud forest flora of Mexico
Flora of the Central American montane forests
Flora of the Sierra Madre Oriental
Flora of the Sierra Madre de Oaxaca
Flora of the Sierra Madre del Sur